Phú Nhuận may refer to several places in Vietnam, including:

Phú Nhuận District, Ho Chi Minh City
Phú Nhuận, Bến Tre, a rural commune of Bến Tre
Phú Nhuận, Bắc Giang, a rural commune of Lạng Giang District
Phú Nhuận, Lào Cai, a rural commune of Bảo Thắng District
Phú Nhuận, Thanh Hóa, a rural commune of Như Thanh District
Phú Nhuận, Tiền Giang, a rural commune of Cai Lậy District